The Madhuvaneswarar Temple is a Hindu temple situated in the town of Nannilam in the Tiruvarur district of Tamil Nadu, India. The presiding deity is Shiva. The temple is believed to have been built by the Early Chola king Kocengannan. It is one of the shrines of the 275 Paadal Petra Sthalams.

Architecture 
Nanillam is one of the many temple towns in the state which is named after the grooves, clusters or forests dominated by a particular variety of a tree or shrub and the same variety of tree or shrub sheltering the presiding deity. The region is believed to have been covered with Madhu forest and hence called Madhuvanam. The temple covers an area of 270 X 130 square feet. The gopura is 30 feet tall and faces east. There are shrines to Ganesha, Murugan, Bhairava, Surya and the Navagrahas.

Significance 

The temple has been praised by Savitie saint Sambandar in the Thevaram.

References

Gallery

External links 
 

Padal Petra Stalam
Shiva temples in Tiruvarur district
Maadakkoil